Forest Chapel stands in an isolated position in the civil parish of Macclesfield Forest and Wildboarclough in Cheshire, England, within the Peak District National Park  from Macclesfield.  It is recorded in the National Heritage List for England as a designated Grade II listed building.  It is an Anglican church in the diocese of Chester, the archdeaconry of Macclesfield and the deanery of Macclesfield.  Its benefice is combined with those of Jenkin Chapel, Saltersford and Holy Trinity, Rainow.

History
The original chapel was built in 1673.  In about 1720 Francis Gastrell, Bishop of Chester noted that it was not consecrated.  The chapel was almost entirely rebuilt in 1834.

Architecture

Exterior
It is built in sandstone with a Kerridge stone-slate roof.  The nave and chancel are in one range of five bays.  On the south wall is a porch.  At the west end is a tower with a saddleback roof and there are louvres in the bell-openings.  The tower contains one bell.

Interior
The interior is very plain.  On the chancel wall is a white marble memorial to the memory of Rev Samuel Hall, a former minister of the church.  Over the porch doorway is a benefaction board.  Built into the east end wall is a stone altar.  The east window contains some Victorian glass.  The chapel registers begin in 1759 with some loose sheets dating back to 1746.

Present day
The old tradition of rushbearing still takes place at the chapel each August on the 2nd Sunday in the month. Regular Services include monthly evensong on the first Sunday on the month at 3pm and weekly 'Light in the Forest' service on Wednesdays at 12.30pm.

See also
Listed buildings in Macclesfield Forest and Wildboarclough

References

External links

Photographs by Craig Thornber

Churches completed in 1673
Churches completed in 1834
Church of England church buildings in Cheshire
Grade II listed churches in Cheshire
Diocese of Chester
17th-century Church of England church buildings
1673 establishments in England